Riverton is an unincorporated rural community in the Canadian province of Nova Scotia, located in  Pictou County.

Riverton is on the Cape Breton and Central Nova Scotia Railway freight-only railway line.

Riverview Adult Residential Care Facility, a centre for mentally handicapped and mentally ill adults operated by Riverview Home Corporation, is located in Riverton.

References

 Riverton on Destination Nova Scotia
Agriculture Profile

Communities in Pictou County
General Service Areas in Nova Scotia